Mangifera is a genus of flowering plants in the cashew family, Anacardiaceae. It contains about 69 species, with the best-known being the common mango (Mangifera indica). The center of diversity of the genus is in the Malesian ecoregion of Southeast Asia, particularly in Sumatra, Borneo, and the Malay peninsula.

Uses
Mangifera species are widely cultivated in Asia and elsewhere. More than 27 species in the genus bear edible, fleshy fruits, especially the common mango (M. indica). Others, such as M. foetida, yield astringent fruits that can be eaten pickled.

Mango wastes, such as the seed kernel and peel, have high functional and nutritional potential. Mango seed contains important bioactive compounds that have high antioxidant activity, lipids that have acceptable physical and chemical characteristics (free of trans fatty acids), and a somewhat high (about 6%) protein content. The mango peel contains considerable amounts of antioxidants and dietary fiber.

Fossil record
The earliest fossil species thought to be related to Mangifera is Eomangiferophyllum damalgiriense from the upper Paleocene of northeastern India. Leaves have also been reported from the Paleocene of Japan and the Eocene of Germany, though these have been considered questionable. Leaf fossils confidently assignable to Mangifera have been collected from Oligocene or early Miocene sediments in northern Thailand.

Taxonomy

Subgenera
Subgenus Mangifera
Section Marchandora Pierre
Section Euantherae Pierre
Section Rawa Kosterm.
Section Mangifera Kosterm.
Subgenus Limus (Marchand) Kosterm.

Species
These species names have been included:

Mangifera acutigemma Kosterm.; Unresolved
Mangifera altissima Blanco; Unresolved
Mangifera amba Forssk.; Unresolved
Mangifera andamanica King; Unresolved
Mangifera anisodora Blanco; UnresolvedMangifera applanata Kosterm.; Unresolved
Mangifera austro-indica Kosterm.; Unresolved
Mangifera blommesteinii Kosterm.; Unresolved 
Mangifera bullata Kosterm. Unresolved 
Mangifera caesia Jack Accepted 
Mangifera campnospermoides Kosterm. unresolved 
Mangifera camptosperma Pierre Unresolved 
Mangifera casturi Kosterm.; Accepted 
 Mangifera cochinchinensis Engl. Accepted (Indo-China)
Mangifera collina Kosterm. Unresolved 
Mangifera decandra Ding Hou; Unresolved 
Mangifera dewildei Kosterm. unresolved 
Mangifera dongnaiensis Pierre Accepted (Vietnam) 
Mangifera flava Evrard Accepted (Indo-China)
Mangifera foetida Lour. Accepted 
Mangifera gedebi Miq. unresolved 
Mangifera gracilipes Hook.f. Unresolved 
Mangifera griffithii Hook.f.  Unresolved 
Mangifera indica L.  Accepted: the common mango (type sp.)  (synonym M. austroyunnanensis Hu)
Mangifera kemanga  Blume  Unresolved 
Mangifera lalijiwa  Kosterm. Unresolved 
Mangifera laurina Blume Accepted 
Mangifera linearifolia (Mukh.) Kosterm. Accepted 
Mangifera macrocarpa Blume  Unresolved  
Mangifera magnifica Kochummen Unresolved 
Mangifera merrllii Mukherji Unresolved 
Mangifera minutifolia Evrard Accepted (Vietnam)
Mangifera monandra Merr.  Unresolved 
Mangifera nicobarica Kosterm.  Unresolved 
Mangifera odorata Griff. Accepted 
Mangifera orophila Kosterm.  Unresolved 
Mangifera pajang Kosterm. Unresolved 
Mangifera paludosa Kosterm.  Unresolved 
Mangifera parvifolia Boerl. & Koord. Unresolved 
Mangifera pedicellata Kosterm. Unresolved 
Mangifera pentandra Hook.f. Unresolved 
Mangifera persiciformis C.Y. Wu & T.L. Ming; Accepted  (synonyms: M. persiciforma C.Y. Wu & T.L. Ming, Mangifera hiemalis J.Y. Liang )
Mangifera pseudoindica Kosterm.  Unresolved 
Mangifera quadrifida Jack ex Wall. unresolved 
Mangifera reba Pierre. Accepted
Mangifera rubropetala Kosterm. Accepted 
Mangifera rufocostata Kosterm. Unresolved 
Mangifera siamensis Warb. ex W. G. Craib Accepted 
Mangifera similis Blume  Unresolved 
Mangifera sumbawaensis Kosterm. Unresolved 
Mangifera superba Hook.f.  Unresolved 
Mangifera swintonioides Kosterm. Accepted (Malesia) 
Mangifera sylvatica Roxb.  Accepted 
Mangifera taipa Buch.-Ham. Unresolved 
Mangifera torquenda Kosterm. Unresolved 
Mangifera transversalis Kosterm. Unresolved 
Mangifera zeylanica (Blume) Hook.f.  Unresolved

Formerly placed here
Bouea oppositifolia (Roxb.) Meisn. (as M. oppositifolia Roxb.)
 Buchanania cochinchinensis (Lour.) M.R.Almeida (as M. axillaris Desr.)
 Elaeodendron glaucum (Rottb.) Pers. (as M. glauca Rottb.)
 Irvingia gabonensis (Aubry-Lecomte ex O'Rorke) Baill. (as M. gabonensis Aubry-Lecomte ex O'Rorke)
 Fegimanra africana (Oliv.) Pierre. (as M. africana Oliv.)
Spondias pinnata (J.Koenig ex L.f.) Kurz (as M. pinnata J.Koenig ex L.f.)

References

 
Anacardiaceae genera